Rashleigh Jackson (12 January 1929 – 1 September 2022) was a Guyanese politician who served as Minister of Foreign Affairs. He died on 1 September 2022, at the age of 93.

References

1929 births
2022 deaths
Guyanese politicians
Foreign ministers of Guyana